The Porter, later Horsbrugh-Porter Baronetcy, of Merrion Square in the City and County of Dublin, is a title in the Baronetage of the United Kingdom. It was created on 24 July 1902 for the Irish lawyer, judge and Liberal politician Andrew Porter. He served as Solicitor-General for Ireland from 1881 to 1882, as Attorney-General for Ireland from 1882 to 1883 and as Master of the Rolls for Ireland from 1883 to 1906. The second Baronet assumed the additional surname of Horsbrugh in 1911.

Porter, later Horsbrugh-Porter baronets, of Merrion Square (1902)
Sir Andrew Marshall Porter, 1st Baronet (1837–1919)
Sir John Scott Horsbrugh-Porter, 2nd Baronet (1871–1953)
Sir Andrew Marshall Horsbrugh-Porter, 3rd Baronet (1907–1986)
Sir John Simon Horsbrugh-Porter, 4th Baronet (1938–2013)
Sir (Andrew) Alexander Marshall Horsbrugh-Porter, 5th Baronet (born 1971)

The heir apparent is the present holder's only son William John Ernest Horsbrugh-Porter (born 2006).

Arms

See also
Porter baronets

Notes

References
Kidd, Charles, Williamson, David (editors). Debrett's Peerage and Baronetage (1990 edition). New York: St Martin's Press, 1990, 
 

Horsbrugh-Porter